Ruskin is a village in Nuckolls County, Nebraska, United States. The population was 123 at the 2010 census.

History
Ruskin was established in 1887 when the Chicago, Rock Island & Pacific Railroad was extended to that point. It was named after John Ruskin, an English academic and art critic.

Geography
Ruskin is located at  (40.144368, -97.868767).

Demographics

2010 census
As of the census of 2010, there were 123 people, 61 households, and 36 families residing in the village. The racial makeup of the village was 94.3% White and 5.7% from other races. Hispanic or Latino of any race were 7.3% of the population.

There were 61 households, of which 18.0% had children under the age of 18 living with them, 55.7% were married couples living together, 3.3% had a female householder with no husband present, and 41.0% were non-families. 39.3% of all households were made up of individuals, and 24.6% had someone living alone who was 65 years of age or older. The average household size was 2.02 and the average family size was 2.67.

The median age in the village was 51.5 years. 16.3% of residents were under the age of 18; 3.3% were between the ages of 18 and 24; 19.6% were from 25 to 44; 33.4% were from 45 to 64; and 27.6% were 65 years of age or older. The gender makeup of the village was 52.0% male and 48.0% female.

2000 census
As of the census of 2000, there were 195 people, 78 households, and 57 families residing in the village. The population density was 466.6 people per square mile (179.3/km). There were 86 housing units at an average density of 205.8 per square mile (79.1/km). The racial makeup of the village was 95.90% White, 3.59% from other races, and 0.51% from two or more races. Hispanic or Latino of any race were 6.15% of the population.

There were 78 households, out of which 33.3% had children under the age of 18 living with them, 71.8% were married couples living together, 1.3% had a female householder with no husband present, and 26.9% were non-families. 26.9% of all households were made up of individuals, and 16.7% had someone living alone who was 65 years of age or older. The average household size was 2.50 and the average family size was 3.04.

In the village, the population was spread out, with 26.2% under the age of 18, 4.6% from 18 to 24, 25.1% from 25 to 44, 22.1% from 45 to 64, and 22.1% who were 65 years of age or older. The median age was 40 years. For every 100 females, there were 87.5 males. For every 100 females age 18 and over, there were 97.3 males.

As of 2000 the median income for a household in the village was $28,750, and the median income for a family was $31,250. Males had a median income of $22,361 versus $17,344 for females. The per capita income for the village was $13,130. About 3.5% of families and 8.6% of the population were below the poverty line, including 22.6% of those under the age of eighteen and none of those 65 or over.

Notable person
Aksel Andersen, musician

References

Villages in Nuckolls County, Nebraska
Villages in Nebraska